Mohamad bin Awang is a Malaysian politician and served as Deputy of Kelantan State Executive Councillor.

Election results

Honour
  :
  Knight Commander of the Order of the Life of the Crown of Kelantan (DJMK) – Dato' (2017)

References

Living people
People from Kelantan
Malaysian people of Malay descent
Malaysian Muslims
Malaysian Islamic Party politicians
Members of the Kelantan State Legislative Assembly
Kelantan state executive councillors
21st-century Malaysian politicians
Year of birth missing (living people)